Cai Mingzhao (born 16 June 1955) is a Chinese politician and journalist. He was appointed President of the Xinhua News Agency in December 2014, succeeding Li Congjun, who had retired. Cai formerly served as deputy director of the State Council Information Office from 2001 to 2009, Editor-in-Chief of the People's Daily from September 2012 to April 2013, and director of the State Council Information Office from April 2013 to December 2014.

Biography
Cai was born in June 1955 in Rizhao, Shandong province. 

He joined the People's Liberation Army in 1970, and the Communist Party of China in 1974. He graduated from Nanjing Normal University in 1983, majoring in Chinese. He worked for the Xinhua News Agency, specializing in science reporting. On November 11, 2020, he was appointed deputy director of the Education, Science, Health and Sports Committee of the Chinese People's Political Consultative Conference.

Cai is a member of the 18th and 19th Central Committees of the Communist Party of China.

References

Living people
1955 births
People's Republic of China politicians from Shandong
Chinese Communist Party politicians from Shandong
Politicians from Rizhao
People's Republic of China journalists
Nanjing Normal University alumni
Xinhua News Agency people